Pat Proft is an American comedy writer, actor, and director. Born in Minnesota in 1947, Proft began his career at Dudley Riggs' Brave New Workshop in Minneapolis in the mid 1960s. He went on to perform as a one-man comedy act in the late 1960s. In 1972, Proft began working at The Comedy Store in Hollywood which led to work in television and film writing for the Smothers Brothers and Zucker, Abrahams and Zucker.

Of the many feature films Proft has written, Wrongfully Accused, is the only one he also directed.  It was released in 1998.

Proft continued to work with David Zucker, and in 2013 announced he was working on a parody film with Zucker involving the Jason Bourne and Mission: Impossible series.

Biography
Proft was born in 1947 in Minnesota. Proft attended Columbia Heights High School where his English teacher Stuart J. Anderson encouraged Proft to develop his talent. Proft would later perform at the Chanhassen Dinner Theatre's stage, acting in musicals even though Proft felt that he "can't sing or dance". In 1972, Proft moved to Hollywood where he began working at The Comedy Store. Jerry and David Zucker saw some of Proft's work at the Comedy Store and would later invite him to join them at Kentucky Fried Theater. Proft received a special thanks message in the credits of the film Airplane! (1980).

Television career
In his early career, Proft wrote for several television and comedy variety shows. Proft was a regular on The Burns and Schreiber Comedy Hour that lasted from June to September 1973. In 1975, Proft would also appear as a regular on Joey & Dad, a variety show featuring Joey Heatherton and her father.

Proft would work as a screenwriter on the situation comedy show When Things Were Rotten developed by Mel Brooks and screened between September and December 1975. The series a satire on the Robin Hood story and was well received by critics but was cancelled in 1975 due to low ratings. In 1976, Proft was writing for Van Dyke and Company, a variety show that was nominated for a Daytime Emmy Award in 1977.

Film career
In 1997, the film Mr. Magoo was released written by Proft and Tom Sherohman. The film was based on the UPA cartoon series from the 1950s and 1960s about a nearsighted eccentric.

The film received poor reviews  Variety stated that both Proft and Sherohman "have labored mightily to cobble together a plot capable of stretching to feature length the one-joke premise of the six-minute cartoons."

In 1998, Proft's directoral debut titled Wrongfully Accused was released. The film was a parody of the thriller genre exemplified by The Fugitive (1993). In the same year, Proft announced a parody of the Dirty Harry film series about an American police officer who heads to England to extradite a criminal without much success and a script titled Deep Titanic: Armageddon and Titanic, Too: It Missed the Iceberg which he also wanted to direct. Titanic, Too: It Missed the Iceberg had actors Leslie Nielsen, Priscilla Presley and David Hasselhoff in talks for starring with a release date originally aimed for early 1999. CNN's film analyst Martin Grove stated the film was not likely to be made as two recent parody films Wrongfully Accused and Plump Fiction were not well received.

In 2013, Proft was working on a script with David Zucker titled Counter Intelligence. Proft described the film as a "Naked Gun take on Mission Impossible and Bourne film series. Zucker would discuss in 2017 that he was working on a script for a fourth Naked Gun film with Proft. No project with Zucker has been made since Scary Movie V. In 2021, Proft was again working on a script for David Zucker titled The Star of Malta, a parody of film noir and heist films.

Personal life
Proft is married to actress and singer Karen Philipp.

Filmography

Feature credits

Acting roles

Television credits
The Burns and Schreiber Comedy Hour (1973)
The Smothers Brothers Show (1975) 
The Jim Stafford Show (1975) 
When Things Were Rotten (1975) 
Welcome Back, Kotter (1975)
Van Dyke and Company (1976)
3 Girls 3 (1977)
The Redd Foxx Comedy Hour (1977) 
Mary (1978) 
Ringo (1978) 
Star Wars Holiday Special (1978)
Detective School (1979) 
Twilight Theater (1982) 
Police Squad! (1982) 
High School U.S.A. (1984)
Super Dave's Spike-Tacular (2009)

Notes

References

External links

Living people
American comedy writers
American male film actors
American male screenwriters
American male television actors
American television writers
Comedy film directors
Male actors from Minnesota
1947 births
American male television writers
Screenwriters from Minnesota
Film directors from Minnesota
Writers Guild of America Award winners